Jutta Wanke (born 16 January 1948) is a German former swimmer. She competed in the women's 400 metre freestyle at the 1964 Summer Olympics.

References

1948 births
Living people
German female swimmers
Olympic swimmers of the United Team of Germany
Swimmers at the 1964 Summer Olympics
Sportspeople from Potsdam